Concordance may refer to:

 Agreement (linguistics), a form of cross-reference between different parts of a sentence or phrase
 Bible concordance, an alphabetical listing of terms in the Bible
 Concordant coastline, in geology, where beds, or layers, of differing rock types form ridges that run parallel to the coast
 Concordant pair, in statistics
 Concordance (publishing), a list of words used in a body of work, with their immediate contexts
 Concordance (genetics),  the presence of the same trait in both members of a pair of twins (or set of individuals)
 Concordance (medicine), involvement of patients in decision-making to improve patient compliance with medical advice
 Concordance of evidence, in law, science, history, etc.
 Concordance system, in Swiss politics, the presence of all major parties in the Federal Council
 Concordance correlation coefficient, in statistics, a measurement of the agreement between two variables
 Concordance database, a database tailored to legal applications and distributed by LexisNexis
 Inter-rater reliability, in statistics, the degree to which multiple measurements of the same thing are similar
 Lambda-CDM model of big-bang cosmology
 Link concordance, a relation between mathematical links in knot theory